"The Backup Dan" is the fourteenth episode of season 5 on the show Gossip Girl. The episode was directed by David Warren and written by Matt Whitney.  It was aired on February 6, 2012, on the CW.
Similar to previous names in the TV series, the title of the episode references a work on literature. The title reference is from the 2010 film The Back-up Plan.

Character summary
Serena van der Woodsen (Blake Lively):

Nate Archibald (Chace Crawford):

Blair Waldorf (Leighton Meester):

Chuck Bass (Ed Westwick):

Daniel Humphrey (Penn Badgely)

Basic plot (from season 5 list of episodes)
Following the wedding, Blair tries to leave for the Dominican Republic, with the help of Dan, to get a divorce from Louis without his consent due to a loophole in the Dominican Republic's law. However, she realizes that she forgot her passport and so asks Dorota for help. Serena, Chuck, Nate reluctantly team up with Georgina to find Blair, until Georgina gets a tip from one of her sources and she leaves. Georgina then, as Gossip Girl, informs Louis and Sophia of Blair's location. Nate, Serena and Chuck eventually find Blair in a hotel room with Dan. Sophia finds Blair and threatens to forcefully sell Eleanor's company as dowry if Blair chooses not to return, on which Blair reluctantly decides to go back. Elsewhere, Nate has another meeting with the real Charlie Rhodes, who goes by the name of Lola. At the end, it is implied that neither Chuck nor Serena, who takes the blame, leaked the video of Blair confessing her love for Chuck. It is revealed that Georgina is simply filling in for Gossip Girl ever since she abandoned the blog after Chuck and Blair's car accident.

Detailed plot
The episode starts with a recap of the previous episode, "G.G." and the title sequence.

Serena is at the wedding and cannot find Blair. She asks Eleanor if she's seen her and Eleanor asks Serena if she thinks that Blair is happy with Louis. Serena goes to ask Louis where Blair is and he says she's in the bathroom when he knows she's not. Georgina Sparks (Michelle Trachtenberg) goes to find Blair too. Serena continues to try to find Blair when Chuck gets a call saying that Blair is at his hotel.

Nate is helping Lola load her catering van when Serena and Chuck tell him to where Blair is. Lola agrees to let them use her catering van so that they can avoid the paparazzi.

Louis is thanking people for coming when he gets a call from his mother. He tells her that he told Blair that they are now in a loveless marriage. She tells Louis she's going to find Blair.

Serena, Chuck, and Nate arrive at Chuck's hotel and Georgina is there to greet them. She tells them she's there to help them find Blair.

Blair and Dan are hiding in a parking garage. Blair is speaking about sneaking to Dominican Republic to get a divorce from Louis without his consent. Dan agrees to take her there in her wedding dress. She goes to buy something to change into while they're waiting to get a flight. Dan answers Blair's phone and he tells Serena that Blair and Louis have left and she forgot her phone.

Blair is able to get a ticket but forgot her passport and calls Dorota for help.

Serena gets a text from Louis saying, "Where the hell are you, get back her immediately".

Dan calls Rufus and asks him to make sure that Sophie and Louis cannot find out where Blair is. He agrees to help.

Georgina shows at Blair's and asks Dorota where Blair is.

Sophie tells Eleanor that if Blair annuls her marriage then Eleanor would have to give her the dowry agreed upon in their pre-nup.

Lola is at Nate's. He goes to get her something to drink. She receives a call from Carol and is clearly lying to her. Nate overhears and asks her to leave since he's tired.

Louis has called a missing person's report on Blair in order to find her. She instantly leaves to a hotel to hide out for the night.

Serena and Chuck go to Blair's and find Dorota locked in Blair's closet. She tells them that Blair has gone to get a divorce. Chuck takes Blair's passport and goes to give it to her. Georgina is outside in a car waiting for them and starts to follow them.

Serena and Chuck go to the hotel that Blair and Dan are at. Dan leaves and Georgina is there to take a picture of them. She then leaves.

Lola shows up at Lily's to drop off some flowers and tells her that she was just with Nate.

Serena and Blair get in a fight and Serena leaves. Chuck offers to take her on his plane but Princess Sophie shows up and tells her she must go with Louis. She reminds them of the dowry she agreed to.

Chuck offers to pay for Blair's dowry so she can be divorced but she refuses and accepts her future.

Blair ends up with Louis and says she only has to be married for one year and they leave for their honeymoon.

At the end of the episode, it's revealed that Dan was the one to publish the video of Blair confessing her love to Chuck.

External links
 The CW station website
 Gossip Girl official website
 Gossip Girl Season 5

2012 American television episodes
Gossip Girl (season 5) episodes